Der Barbier von Bagdad (The Barber of Baghdad) is a comic opera in two acts by Peter Cornelius to a German libretto by the composer, based on The Tale of the Tailor and The Barber’s Stories of his Six Brothers  in One Thousand and One Nights.  The first of three operas by Cornelius, the piece was first performed at the Hoftheater in Weimar on 15 December 1858.

Performance history
Cornelius planned the work as a one-act comedy, but on the advice of Franz Liszt expanded it to two. Franz Liszt later arranged the second overture for orchestra (S.352). Unlike most German comic operas of the period, which have spoken dialogue, Der Barbier von Bagdad is through composed.  Cornelius offered the inventive and complex opera as an alternative to the contemporary German opera composers such as Richard Wagner, whose ideological fervor he found overwhelming.

At its first performance the opera was a failure, and it was not played again in the composer's lifetime.  The composer's mentor and friend Franz Liszt conducted the premiere. However, political actions by the director of the theater resulted in demonstrations against Liszt and the so-called neo-German school of composition. The opera closed after only one performance, and Liszt resigned his post. Cornelius also left Weimar.

In the late 19th century two versions were made, by the noted Wagnerian conductors Felix Mottl and Hermann Levi. In New York City the work was first played in 1890 by the Metropolitan Opera House Company and in London in 1891.  Finally, in June 1904, the original version as composed by Cornelius was again staged in the Weimar Hoftheater, this time to popular approval and critical acclaim.

In the 20th century, the opera was performed infrequently abroad but held its own in German opera companies using the original text, rather than Mottl's or Levi's revisions.  It has a minor niche in the operatic repertoire.

Roles

Synopsis
The hero, Nureddin, is in love with Margiana, daughter of the Cadi. Bostana, a relative of the Cadi, approving of Nureddin, helps him to woo Margiana by making himself presentable. Abdul Hassan, the barber is summoned, and like his confrère of Seville in Rossini's earlier opera, he adopts the role of co-conspirator in the romance. (Like Rossini's Figaro, he delivers a virtuoso patter aria, "Bin Akademiker".)
Margiana waits for Nureddin in the women's quarters of her father's house. He is proposing to marry her off to a rich friend, but when he leaves, Nureddin enters to woo Margiana. A traditional farcical plot then unfolds, with the barber breaking in, Nureddin hiding in a treasure chest and being carried away by servants, and a happy ending when the Caliph arrives and Nureddin is released and betrothed to Margiana.

Recordings
1939: Leonhardt – Eipperle/Waldenau/Osswald/Ludwig-W/Welitsch/Hann – Koch Schwann (live in Stuttgart)
1951: Keilberth – Schlemm/Roesler/Offermanns/Schock/Schmitt-Walter/Böhme – Gebhardt
1952: Hollreiser – Jurinac/Rössl-Majdan/Majkut/Schock/Poell/Frick – Melodram (live in Vienna, mono)
1956: Leinsdorf – Schwarzkopf/Hoffmann/Unger/Gedda/Prey/Czerwenka – EMI
1957: Matzerath -  Helmut Krebs, Benno Kusche, Anneliese Rothenberger, Josef Greindl, Richard Holm & Gisela Litz - Walhall Eternity Series
1973: Hollreiser – Geszty/Schmidt-T/Unger/Kraus-Ad/Weikl/Ridderbusch, Bavarian Radio Chorus and Bavarian Radio Symphony Orchestra – Eurodisc (live in Munich), Preiser Records, CD Cat: MONO 20035 2CD
1974: Leitner – Donath/Schiml/Peter/Laubenthal/Duesing/Sotin; Kölner Rundfunk-Sinfonie-Orchester und Chor – Profil, CD Cat: PH08037

References
Notes

Sources
Holden, Amanda (ed), The Penguin Opera Guide, London: Penguin Books, 1995, 
Information from answers.com
Extensive synopsis at the Music encyclopedia website
Pines, Roger, The Opera Quarterly, Volume 20, Number 1, Winter 2004, pp. 141–143 (available at the Project Muse website (subscription required)

German-language operas
Romantische Opern
Operas
1858 operas
Operas by Peter Cornelius
Music based on One Thousand and One Nights
Operas set in the Middle East